The Eastern Wisconsin Conference is a high school athletic conference made up of 8 Teams around the Lake Shore & Eastern Wisconsin area. Conference schools are members of the Wisconsin Interscholastic Athletic Association based in Stevens Point, Wisconsin.

History 

The conference dates to the early 1980s, when members of the Packerland and Scenic Moraine conferences joined to form the Eastern Wisconsin Conference. In the 2015-2016 school year, as part of a 76-school northeastern Wisconsin realignment, longtime members Plymouth, Kewaskum, Campbellsport and Waupun left to join the East Central Conference and Brillion, Chilton, Roncalli and Valders joined from the Olympian Conference. Chilton and Roncalli were once members of the Eastern Wisconsin, leaving in 1999 and 2007 respectively.

Current members

Former members

References

External links
http://www.easternwisconsinconference.org

Wisconsin high school sports conferences
High school sports conferences and leagues in the United States